is a train station in the city of Takahama, Aichi Prefecture, Japan, operated by Meitetsu.

Lines

Station layout
The station has one side platform serving a single bi-directional track. The station has automated ticket machines, Manaca automated turnstiles and is unattended. The station also has a bookstore, a waiting room, a maintenance room, and a storage room.

Adjacent stations

|-
!colspan=5|Nagoya Railroad

Station history
Takahama-minato Station was opened on February 5, 1914, as a station on the privately owned Mikawa Railway Company.  The Mikawa Railway Company was taken over by Meitetsu on June 1, 1941. The station has been unattended since 2005.

Passenger statistics
In fiscal 2017, the station was used by an average of 2,501 passengers daily.

Surrounding area
Minami Junior High School
Takahama Junior High School

See also
 List of Railway Stations in Japan

References

External links

 Official web page 

Railway stations in Japan opened in 1914
Railway stations in Aichi Prefecture
Stations of Nagoya Railroad
Takahama, Aichi